A sequel is a work of fiction produced after a completed work, and set in the same "universe" but at a later time.

Sequel may also refer to:
 Sequel, a unit of transition that links two scenes, see scene and sequel
 Chevrolet Sequel, the hydrogen fuel car
 SEQUEL, the Structured English QUEry Language, a predecessor of SQL
 Sequel (album), 1980 album by Harry Chapin, as well as its title track
 Sequel Records, a record label
 Sequal (album), 1988 freestyle music group or eponymous album
 The street name of Seroquel, an antipsychotic medication. 
 SQL (Structured Query Language), which is commonly pronounced as "sequel"
 "Sequel" (Space Ghost Coast to Coast), a television episode

See also 
 Prequel, a literary, dramatic, or cinematic work whose story precedes that of a previous work